Serpentichnus (‘snake-like trace’) is a possible Permian trace fossil found in New Mexico, US. It takes the form of foot imprints separated by discontinuous groves interpreted as body imprints. It is attributed to early amphibians (Lysorophia) swimming near the bottom of a shallow body of water with a motion like that of a sidewinding snake.

The interpretation of these marks as a trace fossil is controversial. The marks have also been interpreted as tool marks, formed by a rotating piece of debris that periodically scratched the bottom of a flowing body of water.

References

Vertebrate trace fossils
Lysorophians